The Quebec Phenix was a professional women's ice hockey team in the Canadian Women's Hockey League (CWHL). The team played its home games in Montreal. The team had a wide range of young talent, some from Université Laval, high schools, and others. Former head coach Christian Lefebvre said in a radio interview  that the team typically drew crowds of only about 50 supporters and that sponsors were hard to find. The team closed in 2008 after just one season in CWHL.

Records

Note: GP = Games played, W = Wins, L = Losses, T = Ties, GF = Goals for, GA = Goals against, Pts = Points.

Team records 
Losing streak: 15 games from 29 September 2007 to 5 January 2008.

2007–08 roster

Award and honour
CWHL All-Rookie Team: Goalie: Christine Dufour
6 January 2008 : Christine Dufour makes 51 saves as Phénix ends 15-game losing skid.

References

External links
 (French) La Ligue nationale de hockey féminin dans la région Martin Sylvestre, Courrier Sud, November 13, 2007.

Women's ice hockey teams in Canada
Defunct ice hockey teams in Canada
Canadian Women's Hockey League teams
Ice hockey teams in Quebec City
Women in Quebec
2007 establishments in Quebec
2008 disestablishments in Quebec
Ice hockey clubs established in 2007
Ice hockey clubs disestablished in 2008